Panulirus femoristriga is a species of spiny lobster (family Palinuridae). It occurs in the Indian and Pacific Oceans. IUCN categorizes the species globally as of "least concern". No subspecies are listed in the Catalog of Life.

References 

Achelata
Crustaceans of the Indian Ocean
Crustaceans of the Pacific Ocean
Crustaceans described in 1872
Taxa named by Eduard von Martens